Sidney Parker (1852 - 1897) was a rugby union international who represented England from 1874 to 1875.

Early life

The Honorable Sidney Parker was born on October 3, 1852, in Shirburn Castle, Oxfordshire., the fifth son and seventh child of fifteen children of Thomas Parker, 6th Earl of Macclesfield and Lady Mary Frances Grosvenor (1821–1912), daughter of Richard Grosvenor, 2nd Marquess of Westminster and sister of Hugh Grosvenor, 1st Duke of Westminster. By the age of eighteen he had moved to Liverpool and was working as a merchant's apprentice.

Rugby union career
Parker played his club rugby for Liverpool. He made his winning international debut on February 23, 1874, at The Oval in the fourth meeting of England and Scotland. He again represented England against Scotland the following year in Edinburgh where the match was drawn.

Later life
The Hon. Sidney Parker spent much of his time in India and became a Tea Planter in Assam. He owned tea plantations in Assam of over 1,590 statute acres , known as The Oaklands Tea Estate. Samples of tea from his estate were shown at the India and Ceylon exhibition at Earl's Court London, in 1896 He died on 21 May, 1897 at Hans-house, Hans Street, Middlesex.

References

1852 births
1897 deaths
English rugby union players
England international rugby union players
Rugby union forwards
Liverpool St Helens F.C. players
Parker family